Leg Over Leg is a book by Ahmad Faris Shidyaq, considered one of the founders of modern Arabic literature. Detailing the life of 'the Fariyaq', the alter ego of the author, offering commentary on intellectual and social issues, it is described as "always edifying and often hilarious", "the finest, wildest, funniest and most surprising novel in Arabic", and "[an] unclassifiable book". It was originally published in 1855 in Arabic in Paris. In 2014, there was an English translation by Humphrey T. Davies published by NYU Press.

History 
The book was first published in Arabic 1855 in France. The author did not publish it in his homeland, Lebanon, probably because of the book's comments on religion.

References 

1855 books
Arabic-language novels